{{DISPLAYTITLE:C9H11FN2O5}}
The molecular formula C9H11FN2O5 may refer to:

 Doxifluridine, a second generation nucleoside analog
 Floxuridine, an antimetabolite oncology drug

Molecular formulas